Newcomerstown is a village in Tuscarawas County, Ohio, United States,  east-northeast of Columbus.  In the late 1770s, this was the largest Delaware Indian village on the Tuscarawas River, with 700 residents.  Chief Newcomer (Netawatwes) was the leader of the western Delawares here, and they called the village Gekelmukpechunk. Early French traders and English settlers named the village Newcomerstown after the chief. Soon after the start of the American Revolutionary War, the Delawares moved west to Coshocton, about halfway through what is now the next county.

Name
The name comes from a Lenape (Delaware) village established in the 1760s by Netawatwees (c. 1686-1776), also known as Newcomer. Newcomer migrated to the area from Cuyahoga Falls with his band of Lenape Indians. The Lenape name of the town was Gekelukpechink, meaning "still water." The town was used as a meeting place for the Iroquois Great Council, and English and American traders called it Newcomer's town. By 1771, more than one hundred dwellings had been built. In 1776, more than seven hundred Lenape and several traders lived in the town.

Population in 1900 and 2010
In 1900, 2,659 people lived in Newcomerstown; in 1910, 2,943. The population was 3,822 at the 2010 census.

Geography
Newcomerstown is located at  (40.274350, -81.602482), along the Tuscarawas River.

Demographics

2010 census
As of the census of 2010, there were 3,822 people, 1,598 households, and 982 families living in the village. The racial makeup of the village was 95.6% White, 1.6% African American, 0.2% Native American, 0.3% Asian, 0.5% from other races, and 1.8% from two or more races. Hispanic or Latino of any race were 1.2% of the population.

There were 1,598 households, of which 30.0% had children under the age of 18 living with them, 42.3% were married couples living together, 13.5% had a female householder with no husband present, 5.7% had a male householder with no wife present, and 38.5% were non-families. 33.7% of all households were made up of individuals, and 16.3% had someone living alone who was 65 years of age or older. The average household size was 2.35 and the average family size was 2.98.

The median age in the village was 40.3 years. 24.1% of residents were under the age of 18; 8.7% were between the ages of 18 and 24; 23.2% were from 25 to 44; 26.4% were from 45 to 64; and 17.6% were 65 years of age or older. The gender makeup of the village was 47.4% male and 52.6% female.

2000 census
As of the census of 2000, there were 4,008 people, 1,654 households, and 1,063 families living in the village. The population density was 1,619.7 people per square mile (626.5/km). There were 1,817 housing units at an average density of 734.3 per square mile (284.0/km). The racial makeup of the village was 95.83% White, 2.57% African American, 0.25% Native American, 0.07% Asian, 0.20% from other races, and 1.07% from two or more races. Hispanic or Latino of any race were 0.72% of the population.

There were 1,654 households, out of which 31.4% had children under the age of 18 living with them, 46.8% were married couples living together, 13.2% had a female householder with no husband present, and 35.7% were non-families. 31.0% of all households were made up of individuals, and 16.0% had someone living alone who was 65 years of age or older. The average household size was 2.37 and the average family size was 2.96.

In the village, the population was spread out, with 26.1% under the age of 18, 7.8% from 18 to 24, 26.9% from 25 to 44, 21.2% from 45 to 64, and 17.9% who were 65 years of age or older. The median age was 38 years. For every 100 females there were 86.9 males. For every 100 females age 18 and over, there were 81.8 males.

The median income for a household in the village was $27,414, and the median income for a family was $34,464. Males had a median income of $26,703 versus $18,375 for females. The per capita income for the village was $15,946. About 12.0% of families and 16.0% of the population were below the poverty line, including 26.2% of those under age 18 and 11.4% of those age 65 or over.

Notable people

 Norman Bel Geddes, theatrical and industrial designer
 Woody Hayes, legendary Ohio State Buckeyes football coach
 Frank LaPorte, Major League Baseball infielder
 Chief Newcomer (Netawatwes), western Delaware chief
 Cy Young, Hall of Fame pitcher, honored by Major League Baseball's annual Cy Young Award

References

External links
 Village website
 Newcomerstown Exempted Village Schools
 Newcomerstown Public Library
 Newcomerstown Historical Society

Villages in Tuscarawas County, Ohio
Villages in Ohio
English-American culture in Ohio